"Verpiss' dich" is a song by German female pop-rap group Tic Tac Toe, written by Torsten Börger, Claudia A. Wohlfromm, and Tic Tac Toe. The track is a breakup song, with its lyrics directed at the ex-partner who has left for another woman. The song was released as the fourth and final single from the group's self-titled debut album in October 1996 and topped the charts in Germany and Switzerland. The single sold over 800,000 units by late April 1997.

Track listings
 German, Austrian, and Swiss CD single
 "Verpiss' dich" (single mix) – 4:06
 "Verpiss' dich" (Ich vermiss' dich mix) – 4:44
 "Verpiss' dich" (Egal, verpiss' dich mix) – 2:59
 "Verpiss' dich" (Ich weiß genau, du vermißt mich mix) – 1:53

 German, Austrian, and Swiss 12-inch single
A1. "Verpiss' dich" (Ich vermiss' dich mix) – 4:44
A2. "Verpiss' dich" (Ich weiß genau, du vermißt mich mix) – 1:53
B1. "Verpiss' dich" (Egal, verpiss' dich mix) – 2:59
B2. "Verpiss' dich" (single mix) – 4:06

Charts

Weekly charts

Year-end charts

Certifications

References

Tic Tac Toe (band) songs
1996 singles
1996 songs
Bertelsmann Music Group singles
German-language songs
Number-one singles in Germany
Number-one singles in Switzerland
RCA Records singles
Songs about heartache